John Howlett (8 April 1868 – 15 June 1931) was an Australian cricketer. He played first-class cricket for Auckland and Victoria.

See also
 List of Victoria first-class cricketers
 List of Auckland representative cricketers

References

External links
 

1868 births
1931 deaths
Australian cricketers
Victoria cricketers
Auckland cricketers
Cricketers from Melbourne